DXYM (89.5 FM), broadcasting as 89.5 Brigada News FM, is a radio station owned and operated by Brigada Mass Media Corporation. It serves as the flagship station of Brigada News FM. Its studio and transmitter are located at the 2nd floor, Brigada Complex, NLSA Rd., Brgy. San Isidro, General Santos. It is operates daily 24 hours.

Profile
The station was established in 1997 as Bay Radio in Koronadal. In 2003, the station transferred to Bernabe Coliseum along J. Catolico Ave., General Santos, the former home of DXRE and DXOO.

In October 18, 2009, during its 4th foundation anniversary, Brigada News acquired the station from Baycomms Broadcasting Corporation and became the nucleus of Brigada News FM. It introduced a mix of AM's news and public affairs with traditional FM programming anchored by personalities from Bombo Radyo, Super Radyo and RMN. In 2011, Brigada News FM became the most listened radio station in the city. At the same year, it moved to its current home in Brigada Complex, NLSA Road.

References

Radio stations in General Santos
Radio stations established in 1997